Angela Brunner (12 January 1931 – 17 June 2011) was a German actress.

Personal life 
Brunner was married to German-Australian writer Walter Kaufmann. Their daughters are photographer Rebekka and actress Deborah Kaufmann. She was best known for Puppendoktor Pille for the DFF series Unser Sandmännchen.

Selected filmography 
 Ernst Thälmann - Führer seiner Klasse (1955)
 Junges Gemüse (1956)
 Naked among Wolves (1963)
 The Heathens of Kummerow (1967)
 Die Fahne von Kriwoj Rog (1967)
 Zille and Me (1983)

References

External links 
 

1931 births
2011 deaths
German film actresses
Actresses from Berlin
Ernst Busch Academy of Dramatic Arts alumni
20th-century German actresses
East German actors
East German women